Metra Electronics is an American automotive electronics company established in 1949, specializing in audio electronics systems and 12 volt accessories.

Brands
 T-Spec - installation accessories
 Ethereal - home theater cables and accessories
 Raptor - installation accessories
 Axxess - interface products

Metra is an international electronics company, with the following global technology partnerships:
Bluetrek -  design and production of wireless communication devices such as Bluetooth headsets and car-kit speakerphones; VIBE Car Audio - British car audio brand. Parent company of FLI Audio;
Audio Solutions - TV audio mounts;
Connects 2 - producer and distributor of car audio integration and related accessories;
Ballistic - Sound suppression systems;
The Install Bay - Installation professionals;
Shuriken - batteries for car audio systems;
Icarus - Home theater accessories.

See also 
 Aftermarket
 Connectors for car audio
 ISO 10487
 RCA connector
 Standardisation
 Vehicle audio

References

External links
 

In-car entertainment
Audio equipment manufacturers of the United States